Cuautepec    is one of the 81 municipalities of Guerrero, in south-western Mexico. The municipal seat lies at Cuautepec.  The municipality covers an area of 414.3 km².

As of 2005, the municipality had a total population of 14,554.

References 

Municipalities of Guerrero